Manduca bergi is a moth of the family Sphingidae first described by Walter Rothschild and Karl Jordan in 1903.

Distribution 
It is found in Argentina and Bolivia.

Description 
The wingspan is about 83 mm. The body and wings are greyish creamy buff, dusted with brown and ochreous scales. The head and thorax are without markings, but there are small black lateral patches on the abdomen. The underside of both wings is slightly pinkish. The forewing underside is much more shaded with brown than the upperside. The hindwing upperside is blackish brown.

Biology 
Adults are on wing from January to February, in April, September and November.

References

Manduca
Moths described in 1903
Taxa named by Walter Rothschild
Taxa named by Karl Jordan